Tobias Saunders (c. 1620 – 1695) was a Deputy to the Rhode Island General Assembly (1669, 1671, 1672, 1680, 1681, 1683, and 1690), a Conservator of the Peace (1669, 1678, and 1695) and a founding settler of Westerly, Rhode Island.

Uncertain origins in England
Tobias Saunders, early immigrant to New England was probably born between 1620 and 1625 if he was old enough to travel (apparently independently) to New England and appear in military rolls in Massachusetts by 1643.  While he has been described as the second son and fourth child of Tobias Saunders and Isabel(la) Wilde of the town of Amersham, Buckinghamshire, England this is virtually impossible based on records uncovered while researching the two "Richard Saunders" families of Amersham; one armigerous and one not.  There was a Tobias Saunders, son of Tobias baptized in Amersham 6 Feb 1629/30  The paternal grandparents of that Tobias were Richard Saunders and Johanna Osburne.  The proof that Tobias of Amersham was NOT the early emigrant to New England comes primarily from the record found specifying Tobias of Amersham as an apprentice with the London Grocer's Association in 1645 stating "Sanders Toby son of (the same) of Amersham, Buckinghamshire, innholder to James Hey 12 Nov 1645, Grocers' Company".  This was two years after the older Tobias appeared on the 1643 military rolls of Taunton, Massachusetts. Further, the Tobias of New England was at least 16 in 1643 so born 1627 or earlier, making him older than Tobias of Amersham.  As far as "Sanders" vs. "Saunders", they are equivalent.  Spelling was much less standardized in the 1600s than today and no independent "Sanders" family of Amersham with two generations of "Tobias" has been found while reviewing parish records, wills and court documents.

Re: The Tobias of Amersham, his father owned a coaching inn and his grandfather owned the mill for the Manor of Amersham.  Some secondary sources claim that Saunders was a soldier in England but those sources such as the one cited here by Sarah Saunders Smith conflated the Tobias of Amersham with the Tobias of Rhode Island when in fact they were two different men.  References indicate he was a Life Guard of Foote for King Charles I of England. This entry originally asserted, based on the "Nutmegger article", that "Saunders likely used his inheritance to pay for his passage to America after his father's death in 1642." but again this assumes that Tobias of Amersham was Tobias of Massachusetts and Rhode Island which now seems to be if not disproven, at least in serious doubt.

Regarding Tobias' English origins it is important to note that Paul Saunders in his "Connecticut Nutmegger" article freely admitted that he could not prove the emigrant was Tobias of Amersham.  While he felt that Tobias of Rhode Island naming a daughter "Elizabeth" established a link to Richard Saunders' sister Elizabeth, that was a very common name.  For comparison a Tobias Saunders, son of Edward was baptized in Compton Martin, Somerset in 1624 and the emigrant Tobias also named a son Edward so based on "name-matching", Tobias of Compton Martin was a better fit.  Paul also admitted that for Tobias of Amersham to be old enough to appear on the 1643 military rolls of Taunton, there had to be a delay of at least 3 or 4 years between birth and baptism.  This Saunders family had been established in Amersham for many years and at least 2 older siblings were previously baptized there so a delay of that length between birth and baptism would seem to be unusually long.  Again for comparison, the Tobias of Compton Marin would not require such a delay to be of the correct age in Taunton.  Tobias of Amersham must have been born after July 1620 as he was under 22 at the writing of his father's will and the will made no mention of him being in New England so if he was the emigrant, he would have left for America between July 1642 and August 1643 when he appeared in Taunton.  In summary, the Tobias of Amersham was not only too young to be the man of Taunton in 1643, he was proven to be in London in 1645 as "Tobias Sanders son of Tobias Sanders of Amersham" as a grocer's apprentice, a good fit for the son and grandson of a miller.

Early years in Colonial America
Tobias Saunders first appears in the Plymouth Colony on the Company Rolls of Taunton in August, 1643.  These rolls contain the names of all male persons between sixteen and sixty years, who were able to perform military duty.  Between 1649–1650 Saunders lived in the home of Lawrence Turner, while working at the Saugus Ironworks in the Massachusetts Bay Colony.  By 1654 Saunders and Turner were purchasing property in Newport, Rhode Island. Saunders was recorded as a Freeman in the town of Newport in 1655.

Founding and settlement of Westerly, RI

With the permission of the colonial legislature, a group of Rhode Island speculators purchased a tract of land called "Misquamicut" from the Indian Chief, Sosoa (a.k.a. Ninigret), Chief Sachem of the Niantic Tribe.  By 1661, Tobias Saunders had acquired a quarter of a share in a division of Misquamicut (the area which now encompasses the towns of Westerly, Charlestown, Richmond and Hopkinton, Rhode Island).

Rhode Island settled Misquamicut as a means to anchor its claim to disputed territory.  When Roger Williams secured a land patent from the Earl of Warwick in 1643 Jackson, Rhode Island was not a political entity.  By the time monarchy was restored in England in 1660, the first four Rhode Island towns had joined together as Rhode Island and Providence Plantations. The newly formed colony claimed jurisdiction over the land south of Warwick and between the Pawcatuck River and Narragansett Bay.  The death of the Narragansett sachems Miantonomi and Canonicus created a power vacuum leaving their tribal lands vulnerable.  The Massachusetts Bay Colony proclaimed prior jurisdiction over Pequot country (which it argued, included land west and east of the Pawcatuck River), as part of their spoils from the Pequot War, and created a paper town, Southertowne, (which includes parts of modern day Westerly,  RI and Stonington, CT), to solidify their gains.   The Atherton Trading Company, (which included Humphrey Atherton and John Winthrop the Younger), southern land claims conflicted with part of the land acquired by a group of Rhode Island speculators known as the Pettaquamscut Company. An additional group of Rhode Island speculators, including Benedict Arnold, purchased a title to Misquamicut, the land south of Warwick and west of the Pettaquamscut territory, and actively sought settlers to protect their investment.

The consequence of this situation was claim and counterclaim over the disputed territory.  Usually this was a battle of words, but occasionally adversaries used physical force.  William Chesebrough, a sixty-six-year-old resident of Southertowne, testified that "about thirty six inhabitants of Road Island" were laying out lots within Southerntowne boundaries on the east side of the Pawcatuck River.  When he confronted them, Benedict Arnold and others answered that "they would not try their title anywhere but in Road Island, or in England."  Angry Massachusetts Bay Colony authorities ordered the constable of Southertowne to "apprehend all such persons" and to bring them before the colony's magistrates. Walter Palmer arrested Tobias Saunders, Robert Burdick, and Joseph Clarke and conveyed Saunders and Burdick to Boston.  Placed on trial before Governor John Endicott and associates on November 14, 1661. In response to charges of "forcible entry and intrusion into the bounds of Southerntowne," Saunders and Burdick contended that with the approval of the Rhode Island General Court they had purchased land from Indians and lawfully had begun constructing homes and farms.  Their arguments were ineffective, and they remained in jail for a year until a fine of 40 pounds each was paid and 100 pounds each was raised as security." Roger Williams raised the funds for Saunders and Burdick's release.

The ascension of Charles II of England placed all land claims and charters in jeopardy, particularly if they had been acquired during the English Civil War or the English Interregnum.  With greater concerns before it, the Massachusetts Bay Colony relinquished its claim on the contested territory.  Connecticut stepped into the breach and claimed the territory that Massachusetts had vacated, advancing its own territorial ambitions and serving as a shadow advocate for the Atherton Trading Company. Roger Williams was outraged.  Writing to the deputy governor of Connecticut, John Mason, he reviewed his own influential role during the Pequot War, acquainted Mason with the fact that the Pequots did not live east of the Pawcatuck River, and reminded him of the Rhode Island patent that granted them the area. "However you satisfy yourselves with the Pequot conquest", Williams fumed, "you will find the business at bottom to be, First, a depraved appetite after the great vanities, dreams and shadows of the vanishing life, great portions of life, great portions of land in this wilderness....This is one of the gods of New-England, which the living and most high Eternal will destroy and famish. An un-neighborly and unchristian intrusion upon us, as being the weaker, contrary to your laws, as well as ours, concerning purchasing of lands without the consent of the General Court."

Both Connecticut and Rhode Island desperately needed new royal charters which could potentially resolve the boundary controversy.  Rushing to London as Connecticut's agent, John Winthrop the Younger, skillfully presented his Connecticut's (and less directly, the Atherton Company's) case.  The resulting royal charter of 1662 drew Connecticut's boundaries from Massachusetts Bay Colony's southern border to the Sound and from "Norrogancett River, commonly called Norrogancett Bay" to the Pacific Ocean.  The way was prepared for Connecticut to swallow up the New Haven Colony and to acquire all of southwestern Rhode Island.  New Haven soon capitulated, but Rhode Island fought back through its influential agent, John Clarke.
After more than a year of tactical maneuvering, Clarke and Winthrop reached an agreement that established the Pawcatuck River ("which said River shall for the future be also called alias Narrogansett, or Narragansett River") as the boundary between the two colonies.  In addition, they concurred that the owners and inhabitants on Atherton Trading Company land could "choose to which of those Colloneis they will belong." Clarke's new charter was signed by Charles II on 9 July 1663, establishing a "State where no
constraint could ever be put upon the human conscience and no limit to freedom of human thought". There could be no Royal veto of this charter.

On 24 November 1663 Clarke was voted 100 pounds by the state for his 12 years of work. "It was by the efforts of Dr. John Clarke alone that Rhode Island retained her independence as a colony and her sons enjoyed a liberty of conscience unique in the early history of this land". His charter was not superseded until 1843, a period of 180 years.

Overseeing British colonial policy, the Earl of Clarendon anticipated continued conflict and appointed a royal commission to investigate and resolve the various controversies surrounding Connecticut and the recently acquired Province of New York. Before the commission arrived, trouble had already erupted in Narragansett country. Twenty or more men from Southertowne (which became part of Stonington under Connecticut jurisdiction) crossed the Pawcatuck River, broke into James Babcock's house, and carried him back across the river as a prisoner.  The Rhode Island government protested to Connecticut authorities and suggested that representatives of the two colonies should meet to establish a boundary. In the meantime, Rhode Islanders retaliated in kind.  Pressure was placed on people living on Atherton Trading Company land to pledge their allegiance to Rhode Island.  When John Green instead took Connecticut's side, he was seized and brought before Rhode Island authorities, where he quickly recanted and was restored to Rhode Island protection. Although both colonies made half-hearted attempts to negotiate, each found reasons to delay, and no progress was made.

In 1669, Rhode Island created a town on the eastern side of the Pawcatuck River.  The place called Misquamicut became the town of Westerly, and Tobias Saunders and others were now townsmen as well as freemen.  Connecticut continued to argue that the Narragansett River was their eastern boundary and that the river and the bay were the same.  Rhode Island, unwilling to relinquish its southwestern territory, referred its adversaries to the 1644 patent, the 1664 charter, and the royal commissioners' determination of the King's Province, all of which set the Pawcatuck River as the Boundary.  The problem as the Connecticut agents (Fitz-John Winthrop, was one of the three) well knew, was that their charter confused the Narragansett River with the Narragansett Bay. Although Governor Winthrop in his agreement with Clarke had acknowledged that "Pawcatuck" and "Narragansett" described the same river, they refused to deflate their territorial ambitions.  Profitable lobbying by the Atherton Trading Company also strengthened their resolve.  The conference dissolved with matters worse than before. On 18 July 1669, Tobias Saunders and John Crandall wrote a letter to Thomas Stanton and Thomas Minor, both of Stonington, concerning their examination of Chief Ninigret regarding a rumored Indian plot.

By 17 June 1670, both sides in their frustration opted for force.  The Connecticut commissioners ordered the residents of Westerly to "submit to the government" of Connecticut, and they authorized the constable of Stonington, John Frink, to gather the Rhode Islanders to hear the declaration.  The Westerly citizens did not appear. Instead, Tobias Saunders empowered James Babcock as a constable to arrest "those claiming authority over them".  Babcock apprehended Frink and two other Stonington residents.  Almost immediately Babcock and Saunders were captured and brought before the Connecticut commissioners.  The Connecticut agents had a deal.  They offered Saunders a town office under Connecticut jurisdiction (he is listed as a Selectman of Stonington in 1677) but both he and Babcock had to post bail to appear before magistrates at New London the following June.

The Rhode Island General Assembly warned that Connecticut citizens who disrupted Rhode Island lives, would forfeit any land they owned east of the Pawcatuck River and would face additional prosecution. Residents of Westerly who professed loyalty to Connecticut would also lose their land.  Westerly victims who incurred damage would be reimbursed from the sale of confiscated property.  Connecticut's response was to apprehend one of Westerly's officers, John Crandall.  When Rhode Island objected,  Connecticut replied that people in the disputed territory were supposed to choose which government they wanted rather than having it imposed,  and they complained that their citizens were the ones being molested.  The Rhode Island General Assembly defiantly held their next session at Westerly.  Just prior to the meeting, the constable, James Babcock, was requested to call all the local residents in.  The much-abused Babcock, caught once again in an awkward position, refused.  Nevertheless, twenty-two adult males attended the meeting and swore their fidelity to Rhode Island.  Two of the four non-attendees, included James Babcock, reversed themselves the next day, and they too acknowledged the sovereignty of the King and the Rhode Island government. On 2 May 1673, Tobias Saunders wrote to John Winthrop Jr., Governor of Connecticut, "in the behalf of the rest", requesting that their outstanding fines from Connecticut be forgiven because "we are but a company of poor men". [Winthrop Family Papers, Massachusetts Historical Society, Boston.]

The dispute over Westerly was interrupted by King Philip's War, when most of the English settlers abandoned the region.  Immediately after the war, Connecticut and Rhode Island resumed their dispute.  Not until 1728, did Connecticut and Rhode Island agree on the Pawcatuck River as their boundary.

King Philip's War
On 3 July 1675, Tobias Saunders wrote to Major John (Fitz John) Winthrop, on behalf of Chief Ninigret, concerning King Philip's mischief with Uncas.  On 7 July 1675, Tobias wrote to Wait (Waitstill, brother of Fitz John) Winthrop concerning a meeting between Ninigret and Waitstill tomorrow "near Mr. Stanton's farm", but requesting that Uncas and his men not be invited to attend.

During the war, Saunders remained in Westerly acting as a liaison to Ninigret, and conveying information about the intentions of the various Indian  tribes involved in King Philip's War to Major John Winthrop, Captain Wait Still Winthrop, and Fitz-John Winthrop. During this time, "Certain men among the English, because of their place of residence and their connections, specialized in dealing with one or another of these tribes.  The minister at Norwich, Mr. James Fitch, usually maintained a close liaison with Uncas and the Mohegans.  Thomas Stanton and the Reverend James Noyes of Stonington performed a similar function with the Pequots and the Niantics, while Tobias Saunders of Westerly also had some influence with Ninigret."

On 10 December 1675, Tobias Saunders and Thomas Stanton wrote to Governor Winthrop regarding their meeting that day with Chief Ninigret and his pledge to stand with the English against the Narragansett Indians if it came to war.

Religious beliefs
Tobias Saunders joined the Newport Seventh Day Baptist church and the members living at Westerly frequently held meetings in his home before the Westerly Congregation's meetinghouse was built.

Personal life
Tobias Saunders married Mary Peckham (daughter of John Peckham and Mary Clarke and niece of Rev. John Clarke) in 1661.
ELIZABETH SAUNDERS (1663–1730/31)
Married Captain James Babcock (1664–1736/37) in 1687 and was the mother of Joshua Babcock
JOHN SAUNDERS (1669–1746)married 1. Silence Belcher, 2. Sarah ___.
Captain of the Block Island Trainband (1692)
Justice of the Peace for Westerly, RI (1710–1712, 1714, 1721–1723)
Deputy to the Rhode Island General Assembly (1707, 1718)
EDWARD SAUNDERS (1672–1731/32)married 1, Sarah Bliss, 2. Hannah ___.
STEPHEN SAUNDERS (1675–1746)married 1.Thankful Crandall, 2. Rachel Bliven.
MERCY SAUNDERS (1679–1736)married William Crumb.
BENJAMIN SAUNDERS (1682–1733)married Ann ___.
SARAH SAUNDERS (1684 – ?)
SUSANNA SAUNDERS (1688–1733)married 1. Peter Barker, 2. Peter Wells.

See also

 List of early settlers of Rhode Island
 Colony of Rhode Island and Providence Plantations

References

People of colonial Rhode Island
People from Westerly, Rhode Island
Members of the Rhode Island General Assembly
1695 deaths
Year of birth uncertain